Armenoceras is a genus of actinocerid nautiloid cephalopods whose fossils ranged from the late Whiterockian Stage in the early Middle Ordovician, through the remainder of the period and on into the Upper Silurian.  It is the type genus of the family Armenoceratidae.

The shells of Armenoceras are straight and medium to large in size with a circular to subcircular cross section. The siphuncle is large, located subcentrally to resting on the ventral margin. Segments are wider than long, broadly expanded into the camerae. Septal necks short with wide brings that may be in contact with posterior surface of septa. In most the canal system within the siphuncle in is of the double arc type. Cameral deposits are rare.

Armenoceras is derived from Wutinoceras through a thinning of the connecting rings and a simplification of the endosiphuncular canal system.

The earliest Armenoceras known comes from the lower Whiterock equivalent in northern China and Korea but is unknown in North America until the end of the Middle Ordovician when it appears in Red River faunas. Worldwide, in addition to east Asia and North America including Greenland, Armenoceras has been found in northern Europe, Russia, and Australia.

Armenoceras is thought to have given rise to Nybyoceras in the Chazyan (Flower 1968), although the reverse was earlier suggested in Teichert (1964), and to Selkirkoceras in the Eden-Red River Stage in the Upper Ordovician. Possible Silurian derivatives include  Megadiscosorus, Monocyrtoceras, and Elrodoceras although some may turn our to have Nybyoceras as the progenitor.

References 

 Flower, R.H, 1957, Studies of the Actinoceratida, New Mexico Bureau of Mines and Mineral Resources, Memoir 2. 
 Flower, R.H. 1968, The First Great Expansion of the Actinoceroids; New Mexico Bureau of Mines and Mineral Resources, Memoir 2, PtI.
 Flower, R.H, 1978, Ordovician Cephalopod Faunas and Their Role in Correlation; in The *Ordovician System: proceedings of a Palaeontological Association symposium; Bassett, M.G. (Ed)
 Teichert, C, 1964, Actinoceratoidea, in the Treatise on Invertebrate Paleontology, pub Univ of Kansas and the GSA, Vol K, p K206-207; Fig 137 p K200-201.

Prehistoric nautiloid genera
Actinocerida
Ordovician cephalopods of Asia
Silurian cephalopods
Silurian animals of Europe
Silurian animals of Asia
Middle Ordovician first appearances
Silurian extinctions
Ordovician cephalopods of North America
Paleozoic life of Manitoba
Paleozoic life of the Northwest Territories
Paleozoic life of Nunavut
Paleozoic life of Quebec